Circulus is a genus of very small and minute sea snails with an operculum, marine gastropod mollusks in the family Vitrinellidae.

Species
According to the World Register of Marine Species (WoRMS), the following species with valid names are included within the genus Circulus 
 
 Circulus abruptus Rubio & Rolán, 2022 
 Circulus acuteliratus (Thiele, 1925) 
 Circulus adrianrubioi Rubio & Rolán, 2022 
 Circulus aequatorialis (Thiele, 1925) 
 Circulus alcocerae Rubio & Rolán, 2022 
 Circulus andreae Rubio & Rolán, 2022
 Circulus andreiasalvadorae Rubio & Rolán, 2022 
 Circulus angulatus (A. Adams, 1850) 
 Circulus antoniae Rubio & Rolán, 2022
 Circulus asperRubio & Rolán, 2022
 Circulus austerus Rubio & Rolán, 2022
 Circulus australesensisRubio & Rolán, 2022
 Circulus aximicrostriatus Rubio & Rolán, 2022
 Circulus basislevis Rubio & Rolán, 2022 
 † Circulus bicarinatus (Lamarck, 1804)
 Circulus binodular Rubio & Rolán, 2022
 Circulus biporcatus (A. Adams, 1863)
 † Circulus bonneti (Cossmann, 1907) 
 Circulus boucheti Rubio & Rolán, 2022
 Circulus cachoi Rubio & Rolán, 2022
 Circulus caledonicus Rubio & Rolán, 2022
 Circulus carinamagna Rubio & Rolán, 2022
 Circulus carmensalasae Rubio & Rolán, 2022
 Circulus catenatus Rubio & Rolán, 2022
 Circulus chefyae Rubio & Rolán, 2022
 Circulus choshiensis (Habe, 1961)
 Circulus cinguliferus (A. Adams, 1850)
 Circulus colluvius Rubio & Rolán, 2022
 Circulus communis Rubio & Rolán, 2022
 Circulus congoensis (Thiele, 1925)
 Circulus convexstriatus Rubio & Rolán, 2022
 Circulus convexus Rubio & Rolán, 2022
 Circulus coronatus Rubio & Rolán, 2022
 Circulus cosmius Bartsch, 1907
 Circulus cuatricarinatus Rubio & Rolán, 2022
 Circulus cultrorum Rubio & Rolán, 2022
 Circulus cumtectum Rubio & Rolán, 2022
 Circulus cycloma (Barnard, 1964)
 Circulus davidruedai Rubio & Rolán, 2022
 Circulus decemcords Rubio & Rolán, 2022
 Circulus delectabilis (Tate, 1899)
 Circulus delicatus Rubio & Rolán, 2022
 Circulus depressus Rubio & Rolán, 2022
 Circulus deprinsi Rolán & Swinnen, 2013
 Circulus diaphanus (Finlay, 1924)
 Circulus discordant Rubio & Rolán, 2022
 Circulus discretus Rubio & Rolán, 2022
 Circulus dispersus Rubio & Rolán, 2022
 † Circulus duplicarinus (Marwick, 1929) 
 Circulus duplicatus (Lischke, 1872)
 † Circulus edomitus (Marwick, 1931) 
 Circulus ellenstrongae Rubio & Rolán, 2022
 † Circulus enaulus Lozouet, 1998 
 † Circulus estotensis Lozouet, 1998 
 Circulus euchilopteron (Melvill & Standen, 1903)
 Circulus excellent Rubio & Rolán, 2022
 Circulus exempli Rubio & Rolán, 2022
 Circulus extensus Rubio & Rolán, 2022
 Circulus fijiensis Rubio & Rolán, 2022
 Circulus fininspicor Rubio & Rolán, 2022
 Circulus fundatus Rubio & Rolán, 2022
 Circulus gofasi Rubio & Rolán, 2022
 Circulus gracilis Rubio & Rolán, 2022
 † Circulus grignonensis (Deshayes, 1864) 
 Circulus gyalum (Melvill, 1904)
 Circulus harriettae (Petterd, 1884)
 Circulus harrietwoodae Rubio & Rolán, 2022
 Circulus hasegawai Rubio & Rolán, 2022
 † Circulus helicoides (Hutton, 1877) 
 Circulus horroi Rubio & Rolán, 2022
 Circulus inchoatus Rubio & Rolán, 2022
 Circulus inesae Rubio & Rolán, 2022
 † Circulus inornatus P. Marshall, 1919 
 † Circulus intermedius (Deshayes, 1862) 
 Circulus irregularis Rubio & Rolán, 2022
 Circulus iustus Rubio & Rolán, 2022
 Circulus juanmai Rubio & Rolán, 2022
 Circulus juantrigoi Rubio & Rolán, 2022
 Circulus julioalvarezi Rubio & Rolán, 2022
 Circulus laevis (Kiener, 1838)
 Circulus lenticularis Rubio & Rolán, 2022
 Circulus letourneuxi Rubio & Rolán, 2022
 Circulus liratus (A. E. Verrill, 1882)
 Circulus liricinctus (Garrett, 1873)
 Circulus loyaltiensis Rubio & Rolán, 2022
 Circulus luciae Rubio & Rolán, 2022
 † Circulus lucidus (Cossmann, 1881) 
 Circulus luquei Rubio & Rolán, 2022
 Circulus madagascarensis Rubio & Rolán, 2022
 Circulus maestrati Rubio & Rolán, 2022
 Circulus marchei (Jousseaume, 1872)
 Circulus marcosi Rubio & Rolán, 2022
 Circulus maricarmenae Rubio & Rolán, 2022
 Circulus marquesasensis Rubio & Rolán, 2022
 Circulus mayottensis Rubio & Rolán, 2022
 † Circulus megalomphalus (Cossmann, 1919) 
 † Circulus michaudi (Deshayes, 1862) 
 Circulus microbliquus Rubio & Rolán, 2022
 Circulus microlines Rubio & Rolán, 2022
 Circulus micronodular Rubio & Rolán, 2022
 Circulus microradiatus Rubio & Rolán, 2022
 Circulus microsculpturatus Oliver & Rolán, 2011
 Circulus microspiralis Rubio & Rolán, 2022
 Circulus microstriatus Rubio & Rolán, 2022
 Circulus microtuberculatus Rubio & Rolán, 2022
 Circulus minituber Rubio & Rolán, 2022
 Circulus minutispiralis Rubio & Rolán, 2022
 † Circulus mitis (Deshayes, 1862) 
 Circulus modestus (Gould, 1859)
 Circulus monocoronatus Rubio & Rolán, 2022
 Circulus monteiroi Rubio & Rolán, 2022
 Circulus mortoni Ponder, 1994
 Circulus mozambiquensis Rubio & Rolán, 2022
 Circulus multicordatus Rubio & Rolán, 2022
 Circulus multiradiatus Rubio & Rolán, 2022
 Circulus multistriatus Rubio & Rolán, 2022
 Circulus murilloi Rubio & Rolán, 2022
 Circulus nimis Rubio & Rolán, 2022
 † Circulus nitidus (Deshayes, 1862) 
 Circulus novemcarinatus (Melvill, 1906)
 Circulus novemlicium Rubio & Rolán, 2022
 Circulus obesus Rubio & Rolán, 2022
 Circulus octoliratus (Carpenter, 1856)
 Circulus oliveri Rubio & Rolán, 2022
 Circulus operius Rubio & Rolán, 2022
 Circulus orbignyi (P. Fischer, 1857)
 Circulus ordinatus Rubio & Rolán, 2022
 Circulus osfloridum Rubio & Rolán, 2022
 Circulus osingens Rubio & Rolán, 2022
 Circulus osmagnum Rubio & Rolán, 2022
 Circulus pamilacanensis Rubio & Rolán, 2022
 Circulus papuaensis Rubio & Rolán, 2022
 Circulus parallelus Rubio & Rolán, 2022
 Circulus parcus Rubio & Rolán, 2022
 Circulus paucicordatus Rubio & Rolán, 2022
 † Circulus paulensis Lozouet, 1998 
 Circulus pellucidus (E. A. Smith, 1910)
 Circulus penasi Rubio & Rolán, 2022
 Circulus philippinensis Rubio & Rolán, 2022
 Circulus pilartarazonae Rubio & Rolán, 2022
 Circulus pinsensis Rubio & Rolán, 2022
 Circulus planatus Rubio & Rolán, 2022
 † Circulus planorbillus (Dujardin, 1837) 
 Circulus planorbis (Laseron, 1958)
 † Circulus planorbularis (Deshayes, 1832) 
 Circulus pluripunctus Rubio & Rolán, 2022
 Circulus plurispiralis Rubio & Rolán, 2022
 † Circulus politus Suter, 1917 (accepted > unreplaced junior homonym, secondary homonym of Circulus politus (Morlet, 1888))
 † Circulus politus (Morlet, 1888) 
 Circulus protobrevis Rubio & Rolán, 2022
 Circulus prototuber Rubio & Rolán, 2022
 Circulus proximus Rubio & Rolán, 2022
 Circulus pseudocarinatus Rubio & Rolán, 2022
 Circulus pseudopraecedens Adam & Knudsen, 1969
 Circulus pudicus Rubio & Rolán, 2022
 Circulus punctuslinealis Rubio & Rolán, 2022
 Circulus quinoneroi Rubio & Rolán, 2022
 Circulus quinquecarinatus (Melvill, 1906)
 † Circulus rangii (Deshayes, 1862) 
 Circulus retroconvexus Rubio & Rolán, 2022
 Circulus reunionensis Rubio & Rolán, 2022
 Circulus robustus Rubio & Rolán, 2022
 Circulus rolanorum Rubio & Rolán, 2022
 Circulus rosapereirae Rubio & Rolán, 2022
 Circulus rosenbergi Rubio & Rolán, 2022
 Circulus rossellinus Dall, 1919
 Circulus rudis Rubio & Rolán, 2022
 Circulus rugospiralis Rubio & Rolán, 2022
 Circulus rusticulus Rubio & Rolán, 2022
 Circulus rusticus Rubio & Rolán, 2022
 Circulus ryalli Oliver & Rolán, 2011
 Circulus sandrogorii Rubio & Rolán, 2022
 Circulus scaber Rubio & Rolán, 2022
 Circulus sculptilis (Garrett, 1873)
 Circulus sculpturatus Rubio & Rolán, 2022
 Circulus semisculptus (Olsson & McGinty, 1958)
 † Circulus semistriatus (Deshayes, 1862) 
 Circulus senegalensis Adam & Knudsen, 1969
 Circulus serratus Rubio & Rolán, 2022
 Circulus sexangulae Rubio & Rolán, 2022
 † Circulus sigaretornuformis Lozouet, 1998 
 † Circulus similis (Deshayes, 1862) 
 Circulus similiter Rubio & Rolán, 2022
 Circulus simongrovei Rubio & Rolán, 2022
 † Circulus simplex (Briart & Cornet, 1887) 
 Circulus simpliciter Rubio & Rolán, 2022
 Circulus sixcarinatus Rubio & Rolán, 2022
 Circulus smithi Bush, 1897
 Circulus societyensis Rubio & Rolán, 2022
 Circulus solomonensis Rubio & Rolán, 2022
 Circulus soyoae (Habe, 1961)
 Circulus speciosus Rubio & Rolán, 2022
 Circulus spiralis Rubio & Rolán, 2022
 † Circulus spirorbis (Lamarck, 1804) 
 Circulus stephani Rolán & Ryall, 2002
 Circulus striatus (Philippi, 1836)
 Circulus structus Rubio & Rolán, 2022
 Circulus suavis Rubio & Rolán, 2022
 † Circulus subcirculus (Cossmann & Peyrot, 1917) 
 † Circulus subedomitus (Laws, 1936) 
 Circulus subradiatus Rubio & Rolán, 2022
 Circulus subsuturalis Rubio & Rolán, 2022
 Circulus subtatei (Suter, 1907)
 Circulus sulcatus (A. Adams, 1850)
 Circulus supranitidus (Wood S., 1848)
 Circulus susomendezi Rubio & Rolán, 2022
 Circulus suspensus Rubio & Rolán, 2022
 Circulus suturcaten Rubio & Rolán, 2022
 Circulus taiwanensis Rubio & Rolán, 2022
 Circulus tatei (Angas, 1879)
 Circulus templadoi Rubio & Rolán, 2022
 † Circulus tenuiliratus (Cossmann, 1915) 
 Circulus tenuiradiatus Rubio & Rolán, 2022
 † Circulus tenuistriatus (Deshayes, 1862) 
 Circulus teramachii (Habe, 1958)
 Circulus texanus (Moore, 1965)
 Circulus tongaensis Rubio & Rolán, 2022
 Circulus transculptus (Laseron, 1958)
 Circulus troncosoi Rubio & Rolán, 2022
 Circulus tuberopertus Rubio & Rolán, 2022
 Circulus umbilicordatus Rubio & Rolán, 2022
 † Circulus unicarinus (Laws, 1940) 
 Circulus urgorrii Rubio & Rolán, 2022
 Circulus valdesculpturatus Rubio & Rolán, 2022
 Circulus vanuatuensis Rubio & Rolán, 2022
 Circulus venustus (Hedley, 1901)
 Circulus victormonzoi Rubio & Rolán, 2022
 Circulus villacampae Rubio & Rolán, 2022
 Circulus virginiae (Jousseaume, 1872)
 Circulus virginieherosae Rubio & Rolán, 2022

The Indo-Pacific Molluscan Database also mentions the following species with names in current use :
 Circulus callusa (Laseron, 1958)
 Circulus pachyston (Verco, 1907)

Species brought into synonymy
 Circulus bailyi Hertlein & A. M. Strong, 1951: synonym of Cyclostremiscus bailyi (Hertlein & A. M. Strong, 1951)
 Circulus biporcata [sic]: synonym of Circulus biporcatus (A. Adams, 1863)
 Circulus carinulatus Locard, 1889: synonym of  Circulus striatus (Philippi, 1836)
 Circulus cerrosensis Bartsch, 1907 accepted as Cyclostremiscus cerrosensis (Bartsch, 1907)
 Circulus cingulatus Bartrum, 1919 † accepted as Pterolabrella cingulata (Bartrum, 1919) †
 Circulus costulatus Locard, 1889: synonym of Circulus striatus (Philippi, 1836)
 Circulus cubanus Pilsbry & Aguayo, 1933: synonym of Cyclostremiscus cubanus (Pilsbry & Aguayo, 1933)
 Circulus dalli Bush, 1897: synonym of Cyclostremiscus dalli (Bush, 1897)
 Circulus delectabile (Tate, 1899) accepted as Circulus delectabilis (Tate, 1899) (unaccepted > incorrect grammatical agreement of specific epithet)
 Circulus diomedeae Bartsch, 1911 accepted as Cyclostremiscus diomedeae (Bartsch, 1911)
 Circulus formosissimus Brugnone, 1873: synonym of Skeneoides jeffreysii (Monterosato, 1872)
 Circulus hendersoni (Dall, 1927): synonym of Cyclostremiscus hendersoni (Dall, 1927)
 Circulus jeffreysii Monterosato, 1872: synonym of Skeneoides jeffreysii (Monterosato, 1872)
 Circulus madreensis F. Baker, Hanna & A. M. Strong, 1938 accepted as Cyclostremiscus madreensis (F. Baker, Hanna & A. M. Strong, 1938)
 Circulus margaritiformis (Dall, 1927): synonym of Cirsonella margaritiformis (Dall, 1927)
 Circulus modesta [sic]: synonym of Circulus modestus (Gould, 1859)
 Circulus nicholsoni A. M. Strong & Hertlein, 1939 accepted as Episcynia nicholsoni (A. M. Strong & Hertlein, 1939)
 Circulus perlatus Pelseneer, 1903 accepted as Orbitestella perlata (Pelseneer, 1903) (original combination)
 Circulus sarsi (Bush, 1897) accepted as Orbitestella sarsi (Bush, 1897)
 Circulus stirophorus M. Smith, 1937: synonym of Cyclostremiscus beauii (P. Fischer, 1857)
 * Circulus taigai Hertlein & A. M. Strong, 1951 accepted as Cyclostremiscus taigai (Hertlein & A. M. Strong, 1951)
 Circulus tornata [sic]: synonym of Circulus tornatus'' (A. Adams, 1864)
 Circulus tornatus (A. Adams, 1864): synonym of Tuberes tornatus (A. Adams, 1864) (unaccepted > superseded combination)
 Circulus translucens (Dall, 1927): synonym of Xyloskenea translucens (Dall, 1927)
 Circulus tricarinatus (Wood S., 1848): synonym of accepted as Circulus striatus'' (Philippi, 1836)

References

 Kuroda T. & Habe T. 1952. Check list and bibliography of the Recent marine Mollusca of Japan. Leo W. Stach, Tokyo. 210 pp
 Habe, T. (1961). Descriptions of fifteen new species of Japanese shells. Venus. 21(4): 416-431.
 Oliver, J. & Rolan, E., 2011. The family Tornidae (Gsatropoda: Rissooidea) in the East Atlantic, 2. Circulinae. Iberus 29(1): 9-33
 Rubio, F. & Rolán, E. (2022). New species of Vitrinellidae (Gastropoda: Truncatelloidea) from the Indo-Pacific. The genus Circulus Jeffreys, 1865. Museo de Historia Natural, Universidad Santiago de Compostela. 422 pp.

External links
 Iredale, T. (1915). A commentary on Suter's Manual of the New Zealand Mollusca. Transactions and Proceedings of the New Zealand Institute. 47: 417-497
 Kuroda, T. & Habe, T. (1954). On some Japanese Mollusca described by A. Adams, whose specimens are deposited in the Redpath Museum of Canada (No. 1). Venus. 18(1): 1-16, pls 1-2.
 effreys J.G. (1862-1869). British conchology. Vol. 1: pp. cxiv + 341 (1862). Vol. 2: pp. 479 (1864). Vol. 3: pp. 394 (1865). Vol. 4: pp. 487 (1867). Vol. 5: pp. 259 (1869). London, van Voorst.
 Ponder, W.F. (1994).The anatomy relationships of three species of vitrinelliform gastropods (Caenogastropoda: Rissooidea) from Hong Kong. In: Proceedings of the Third International workshop on the malacofauna of Hong Kong and Southern China (Eds. Motrton, B.). The malacofauna of Hong Kong and southern China III, pp243-281. Hong Kong University Press, Hong Kong

Vitrinellidae
Gastropod genera